Jana Novotná was the defending champion but lost in the semifinals to Lindsay Davenport.

Davenport won in the final 7–6, 7–5 against Nathalie Tauziat.

Seeds
A champion seed is indicated in bold text while text in italics indicates the round in which that seed was eliminated. The top four seeds received a bye to the second round.

  Martina Hingis (quarterfinals)
  Jana Novotná (semifinals)
  Iva Majoli (second round)
  Lindsay Davenport (champion)
  Amanda Coetzer (second round)
  Anke Huber (second round)
  Irina Spîrlea (second round)
  Arantxa Sánchez Vicario (first round)

Draw

Final

Section 1

Section 2

Qualifying

Seeds

Qualifiers

Lucky loser
  Anne-Gaëlle Sidot

Qualifying draw

First qualifier

Second qualifier

Third qualifier

Fourth qualifier

External links
 Official results archive (ITF)
 Official results archive (WTA)

Zurich Open
1997 WTA Tour